Justice Richards may refer to:

Charles S. Richards (1878–1971), justice of the Delaware Supreme Court
David Richards, Lord Richards of Camberwell (born 1951), justice of the Supreme Court of the United Kingdom
Frederick Richards (judge) (1869-1957), justice of the Supreme Court of South Australia
John E. Richards (1856–1932), associate justice of the California Supreme Court
Paul W. Richards (judge) (1874–1956), justice of the Iowa Supreme Court
Stephen Richards (judge) (born 1950), Lord Justice of Appeal of the High Court of Justice (Queen's Bench Division)

See also
Judge Richards (disambiguation)